William Trimble may refer to:

 William A. Trimble (1786–1821), American politician from Ohio
 William C. Trimble (died 1996), American diplomat